Alexander William Mair (9 June 1875–13 November 1928) was a 20th century Scottish scholar who was a professor of Greek at the University of Edinburgh. He was an authority on the works of the Greek poet Hesiod.

Life

Mair was born in Edinburgh on 9 June 1875, the son of Rev Alexander Mair of the United Presbyterian Church. The family lived at 7 Abbotsford Park in the Morningside district. He studied Classics at the University of Cambridge.

In 1899/1900 his father served as the final Moderator of the General Assembly of the United Presbyterian Church.

He was a Fellow of Gonville and Caius College, Cambridge.

In 1908 he took up the position of professor of Greek at the University of Edinburgh, succeeding Samuel Henry Butcher.

He died in a house fire at his home, 9 Corennie Drive, in Morningside, Edinburgh on 13 November 1928, in his study. He is buried in Morningside Cemetery, Edinburgh.

After his death, his position at the university was filled by Arthur Wallace Pickard-Cambridge.

Family
Mair married Elizabeth Mackay Bisset (1882-1950). Together they had 13 children including: Gilbert Mair (the oldest), Gwen, Eileen, Enid, Colin, Hugh (died in infancy) Katharine (1908-1998) and the rugby player Norman Mair (the youngest).

Publications
Hesiod: The Poems and Fragments (1908)
Callimachus and Lycophron (1921)
Poems by Alexander william Mair (1929)
Works and Days
Fragments and the Shield of Herakles
Fragments and Theogony

References

1875 births
1928 deaths
Academics from Edinburgh
Alumni of the University of Cambridge
Academics of the University of Edinburgh
Scottish classical scholars
Fellows of Gonville and Caius College, Cambridge
Accidental deaths in Scotland
Deaths from fire